Anund   meaning trail-blazer Anund or Anund the Land Clearer; alternate names Brøt-Anundr (Old East Norse) or Braut-Önundr (Old West Norse)  was a semi-legendary Swedish king of the House of Yngling who reigned in the mid-seventh century. The name would have been Proto-Norse *Anuwinduz meaning "winning ancestor".

History
In his Ynglinga saga, Snorri Sturluson relates that Anund succeeded his father King Yngvar who fell in battle with the Estonians.  After his father's wars against Danish Vikings and Estonian Vikings, peace reigned over Sweden and there were good harvests. Anund was a popular king who became very rich, not only because of the peace and the good harvests but also because he avenged his father in Estonia. That country was ravaged far and wide and in the autumn Anund returned with great riches.

In those days Sweden was dominated by vast and uninhabited forests, so Anund started making roads and clearing land and vast districts were settled by Swedes. Consequently, he was named Bröt-Anund. He made a farm for himself in every district and used to stay as a guest in many homes.

One autumn, King Anund was travelling between his halls (see Husbys) and came to a place called Himinheiðr (sky heath) between two mountains. He was surprised by a landslide which killed him.

After presenting this story of Anund, Snorri Sturluson quotes Þjóðólfr of Hvinir's Ynglingatal:

The Historia Norwegiæ presents a Latin summary of Ynglingatal, older than Snorri's quotation (continuing after Ingvar):

The original text of Ynglingatal is hard to interpret, and it only says that Anund died und Himinfjöllum (under the sky mountains) and that stones were implied. According to Historia Norwegiæ, he was murdered by his brother Sigvard in Himinherthy (which the source says means "the fields of the sky", cœli campus. Such a place name is not known and Swedish archaeologist Birger Nerman (1888–1971) suggests that the original place of death was under the sky mountains, i.e. under the clouds (cf. the etymology of cloud). Consequently, he may have been killed outdoors, by his brother and with a stone.

Thorsteins saga Víkingssonar says that Anund was not the son of Ingvar, but Östen. It also relates that he had a brother named Olaf who was the king of Fjordane.

All sources say that Anund was the father of Ingjald (Ingjald Illråde).

See also
Anundshög

References

Primary sources 
 Historia Norwegiæ
 Thorsteins saga Víkingssonar
 Ynglingatal
 Ynglinga saga (part of the Heimskringla)

Secondary sources 
Birger Nerman (1925) Det svenska rikets uppkomst (Stockholm: Föreningen för svensk kulturhistoria)

640 deaths
7th-century rulers in Europe
People whose existence is disputed
Semi-legendary kings of Sweden
Year of birth unknown